Waves of Lust (also known as A Wave of Pleasure) is a 1975 Italian erotic thriller-drama film directed by Ruggero Deodato and starring John Steiner and Silvia Dionisio.

Plot
Irem and Barbara are a young Italian couple on vacation in Sicily when they meet and are invited by a married and wealthy older couple, named Giorgio and Silvia, on board a yacht owned by Giorgio for a weekend of sailing and carefree time. Irem and Barbara soon become involved in Giorgio and Silvia's marital problems as Giorgio, a cynical and ruthless industrialist, verbally and physically abuses Silvia for his own twisted enjoyment to control her. Eventually, both Irem and Barbara become romantically involved with Silvia, leading to Giorgio to become more mentally unstable over his losing control over Silvia. It eventually leads to Giorgio killing Silvia in a jealous rage and pretending that it was an accident. Irem and Barbara then turn the tables on their host when they murder Giorgio by getting him drunk one evening during dinner and drowning him to make it look like a scuba diving accident. The young couple then sails away on the late Giorgio's yacht to enjoy the rest of their carefree vacation.

Cast 
 Al Cliver as Irem 
 Silvia Dionisio as Barbara
 John Steiner as Giorgio
 Elizabeth Turner as Silvia

See also
 List of Italian films of 1975

References

External links
  

1970s thriller drama films
Films directed by Ruggero Deodato
Italian thriller drama films
Italian erotic drama films
1970s erotic thriller films
Italian erotic thriller films
1975 drama films
1975 films
Films set in Sicily
1970s Italian films